Hassan Sayyad Khodaei (1972 - May 22, 2022) was an Iranian military officer who served in the Islamic Revolutionary Guard Corps (IRGC). Serving as a Holy Shrine Defender, he was assassinated on 22 May 2022 by motorcycle-riding gunmen in front of his home. Iran has blamed the assassination on "global arrogance," a term used to refer to the United States and its allies, such as Israel. According to the Wall Street Journal, the New York Times and other sources citing people familiar with the matter, Khodaei planned kidnappings and killings for an arm of the IRGC known as Quds Force Unit 840, including failed plots to kill an Israeli diplomat, an American general and a French intellectual.

Background 
Hassan Sayyad Khodaei was born in 1972 in the Bashmaq, a village in Kolah Boz-e Gharbi Rural District, in the Central District of Mianeh County, East Azerbaijan Province. Sayyad Khodaei joined the Revolutionary Guard (IRGC) in 1987. Later, he was active as a Holy Shrine Defender. This phrase refers to those who fight against ISIS in Syria and Iraq as part of the Quds Force, responsible for extraterritorial operations. Iranian scientists and academics have been killed or attacked by explosions, bombs, or motorcycle-riding shooters since 2010. Israel has a history of assassinating nuclear scientists inside Iran in the same style. On 27 November 2020, the Israeli government, with knowledge and support from the US government assassinated a top nuclear scientist Mohsen Fakhrizadeh.

Assassination 
On 22 May 2022, Colonel Khodaei was returning home in the south of Tehran when he was fatally shot five times by motorcycle-riding gunmen on Sunday afternoon in his car, SAIPA Pride, a cheap non-armored car, outside his home at around 4 pm (11:30 GMT). There has been no claim of responsibility for the assassination, but according to The Guardian  the assassination style increases the chance of being linked to a series of previous motorcycle killings in Iran imputed to Israel, such as Assassination of Iranian nuclear scientists.

Reactions 

On 23 May 2022, Ebrahim Raisi, president of Iran promised to avenge the assassination. He described Colonel Khodaei as Martyr and blamed global arrogance for his assassination.

Hossein Salami, the commander-in-chief of IRGC vowed severe revenge and a strong response to the evil actions of the enemy.

On 25 May 2022, Iran called on the international community to condemn such "cruel" assassinations that target other countries' innocent citizens.

The New York Times reported that Israel had informed US officials about its role in assassination of a senior member of IRGC. Israel reportedly claimed the assassination was an attempt to warn Iran about the continuation of the operation of an alleged secret unit where Khodaei was a member. According to Ynet, Israel was outraged by the leak, and Israeli officials told Ynet that they were asking their American counterparts for a response since the New York Times report had blamed only Israel for the killings without mentioning the U.S. involvement.
Israel claimed Khodaei was the deputy head of an alleged secret unit known as 840 in the Quds Force that carried out kidnappings and assassinations of figures outside Iran, mostly against Israelis. Israel referred to the confessions of an Iranian farmer named Mansour Rasouli who, according to Israel, confessed to plotting attacks against American and Israeli figures. Rasouli rejected any involvement in the operation. Later he said that he was kidnapped by Mossad and threatened to be killed along with his family and that he was forced to confess under torture.

On June 3, Ali Esmailzadeh, another colonel of the Quds Force, died after falling from a roof in a supposed accident. An Iranian opposition source claimed he was killed by the IRGC over suspicions he leaked information that led to the assassination of Khodaei.

See also
 2020 Iran explosions
 Assassination of Iranian nuclear scientists
 Assassination and terrorism in Iran
 Iran and weapons of mass destruction
 Iran–Israel proxy conflict
 Israel and state-sponsored terrorism

References

1972 births
2022 deaths
Assassinated Iranian people
Assassinations in Iran
Iranian nuclear physicists
People murdered in Iran
Iran–Israel proxy conflict
Nuclear program of Iran
Iranian individuals subject to the U.S. Department of the Treasury sanctions